Soós may refer to:

 Árpád Soós (zoologist) (1912–1991), Hungarian zoologist
 Bela Soós (1930–2007), Romanian chess player
 Edit Soós (1934–2008), Hungarian actress
 Győző Soós, (1948–2015), Hungarian politician
 Imre Soós (1930–1957), Hungarian actor
 Károly Soós (Minister of Defence) (1869–1953), Hungarian military officer
 Viktória Soós, (b 1985) Hungarian handballer

See also
 Soos (disambiguation)